Andromeda were an English psychedelic rock group, that formed in 1966. However, soon after formation, the band changed lineup, and led by John Du Cann a new line-up recorded their eponymous album in 1969 with backing vocals by Eddie Dyche.

The group split upon Du Cann's departure to join Atomic Rooster in 1970.

Du Cann, Hawksworth, and Collins also comprised the one-off studio band The Five Day Week Straw People. Hawksworth later briefly joined Killing Floor.

In September 2017, a copy of their first album sold for over £1,000 ($1,200 USD) on Discogs.

Band members
John Du Cann - lead vocals, guitar
Mick Hawksworth - bass guitar
Jack McCulloch (aka Jack Collins)  - drums
Ian McLane - drums

Discography

Singles
 "Go Your Way" / "Keep out 'Cos I'm Dying" (RCA Victor) 1969

Albums
 Andromeda (RCA Victor) 1969
 7 Lonely Street (Reflection) 1990
 Anthology 1966-1969 (Kissing Spell) 1994
 Live at Middle Earth (Kissing Spell) 1994
 Originals (Angel Air) 2005
 Beginnings 1967-68 (Angel Air) 2007

Compilation albums
 See into the Stars (SAR.CD 003-4) 1990
 Return to Sanity (Background) 1992
 Definitive Collection (Angel Air) 2000

The original album was re-released in 2000 as a two disc set that contained that album and a number of demos, singles, and live recordings under the name of Definitive Collection.

References

External links
 Andromeda at EP Music
 
 

English progressive rock groups
English psychedelic rock music groups
Musical groups established in 1966
Musical groups disestablished in 1969